The 36th TVyNovelas Awards is an academy of special awards to the best of soap operas and TV shows. The awards ceremony took place on February 18, 2018. The ceremony was televised in Mexico by Las Estrellas.

Jacqueline Bracamontes and Inés Gómez Mont hosted the ceremony. Caer en tentación won 10 awards, the most for the evening including Best Telenovela of the Year. Other winners Papá a toda madre won 4 awards, Mi marido tiene familia won 2 awards, La doble vida de Estela Carrillo and Me declaro culpable won one award each.

Summary of awards and nominations

Winners and nominees

Novelas

Others

References 

TVyNovelas Awards
TVyNovelas Awards ceremonies
TVyNovelas Awards
Premios TVyNovelas